Matija Divković (1563 – 21 August 1631) was a Bosnian Franciscan and writer. He is considered to be the founder of Bosnia and Herzegovina literature.

Life

Divković was born in Jelaške near Olovo in the then-Eyalet of Bosnia. He probably joined the Franciscans in the nearest monastery in Olovo and was schooled there. He continued his studies in Italy, but then returned to Bosnia to work there. In 1609 he was a chaplain in Sarajevo. It is plausible that he also performed other duties, since the monasteries of that age usually had schools. It was there that Divković wrote his first work, Christian Doctrine for the Slavic People, and started to translate One Hundred Miracles or Signs of the Blessed and Glorious Virgin. In 1611 Matija Divković traveled to the Republic of Venice, where he first had the Cyrillic letters molded, and then printed both works.

In 1612, Divković came to the monastery of Kreševo and started writing his greatest and most important book, Divković's Words on Sunday Gospel All Year Round, completed in Olovo (1614). It was also printed in bosančica in Venice 1616 (2nd edition in 1704), as well as Christian Doctrine with Many Spiritual Matters (1616, several later editions).

Matija Divković published his works with the advice and support of Bartul Kačić-Žarković, bishop of Makarska (1615–1645), who managed some parishes in Bosnia. There were also links between Bosnian Franciscans and the Franciscan monasteries around Makarska (Živogošće, Zaostrog, Makarska). Nothing else is known about Divković's life.

He died in Olovo on 21 August 1631.

Analysis of his work

Divković wrote his books to meet the needs of the Catholic folk. The big Christian Doctrine from 1611 was intended for clerics, while the small Christian Doctrine from 1616 became a textbook for the people. The former is made up of several unidentified Latin works (the sermons of John Herolt, Bernardine Bastio, etc.). The latter looks like a dialog between a teacher and a student, mixing verses and prose, with various religious and educational themes. The Small Doctrine was one of the most popular books in Bosnia and Herzegovina and widely used in neighboring Dalmatia.

The Small Doctrine had as many as eight editions. Divković had its content "made into one from Ledezmo's and Bellarmino's learning". More precisely, Divković used the Croatian translation of the catechism of James Ledezmo (1578), the Italian original of Roberto Bellarmino and the Croatian translation of his book by A. Komulović. The Small Doctrine includes the Tears of the Blessed Virgin Mary in eight-syllable verses, written as a variation on the "crying" literature from the age of Croatian glagolitic literature. Verses on Abraham and Isaac are a paraphrase of the Abraham of Mavro Vetranović; the life of St Catherine, also in verses, is a paraphrase of an older peoples legend.

One Hundred Miracles… is a loose translation of the medieval legends of John Herolt (Promptuarium discipuli de miraculis B. M. Virginis, Venice, 1598). Words... is a collection of sermons for priests and nuns, mostly after the collections of Herolt (Sermones discipuli de tempore et de Sanctis) and some other Catholic authors.

Meaning and legacy
Matija Divković is distinguished with the historical title of the founder of the Bosnia and Herzegovina literature. This means that he was Bosnian Franciscan who wrote in narodni jezik, which was, beside Bosnian, at the time a common name among Bosnians for the South Slavic language, Štokavian dialect. Such medieval writings, found in Bosnia and Herzegovina, Dalmatia, Old Herzegovina, like the Gršković's Apostle, the Hrvoje's Missal, the Hval's Codex, the Venetian Apocalypse, belong to the Bosnian literature, and are considered the written heritage, but not a literature in the strict modern sense.

The above analysis shows that Divković was not always an original writer, but a translator and compiler. As a translator, he was not meticulous about being faithful to his sources, which means that he modified them to bring them closer to the folk mixed idiom of the Eastern-Bosnian Štokavian dialect and Ikavian–Ijekavian accent, spoken between Olovo and Kreševo in Bosnia.

Considering the sources he used within the Counter-Reformation, his choice was already obsolete in his age, since during the Catholic Baroque period, he found his models in Catholic literature of the late Middle Ages, which doesn't mean that he was not well versed in the literature of his time. Actually, researchers believe that Divković was very interested in his local public, so he chose those works that would have the strongest impact on the overall goal of Counter-Reformation, which explain why Divković had such a great success and gained reputation within Croatian circles that only Andrija Kačić Miošić could surpass. While the other Counter-Reformers went along with the times, using rationalism to lure people, Divković went back to the Middle Ages to attract his public. His retelling of the biblical stories and ancient legends exemplify medieval imagination. In that regard, Divković's didactic prose is saturated with fiery imagery of hell and purgatory for sinners and paradisical bliss for the just, while his sermons abound with the tales of the miraculous and the supernatural.

Influence on Croatian literary development
Divković and his style had been largely followed by Croatian writers, who all contributed to the eventual victory of the Štokavian dialect in Croatian literature. Some of them were Stjepan Margitić and Stjepan Matijević in Bosnia, Toma Babić in Skradin, Pavao Stošić in Lika, Antun Depope on Krk and Đuro Matijašević in Dubrovnik. Finally, Divković was one of the reasons why Croats finally accepted Štokavian-Ijekavian as the dialectal basis of the standard language in the 19th century, hence the claim for belonging to Croatian written heritage.

See also

 List of Glagolitic books

Works
 Nauk krstjanski za narod slovinski (Christian Doctrine for the Slavic People, 1611)
 Sto čudesa aliti znamenja blažene i slavne Bogorodice (One Hundred Miracles or Signs of the Blessed and Glorious Virgin, 1611)
 Beside Divkovića vrhu evandelja nedjeljnieh priko svega godišta (Divković's Words on Sunday Gospel All Year Round, 1616)
 Nauk krstjanski s mnoziemi stvari duhovniemi 1616 (Christian Doctrine with Many Spiritual Matters), edition 1641

Works on Divković and his work
 DIVKOVIĆ: OTAC BOSANSKE KNJIŽEVNOSTI, PRVI BOSANSKI TIPOGRAF by Ivan Lovrenović
 Iskušenje fra Matije Divkovića u Mlecima by Ivan Lovrenović

References

1563 births
1631 deaths
Bosnia and Herzegovina writers
Bosnia and Herzegovina Roman Catholic priests
Languages of Bosnia and Herzegovina
Franciscans of the Franciscan Province of Bosnia
Christian clergy from the Ottoman Empire
17th-century writers from the Ottoman Empire
Bosnian language
17th-century Roman Catholic priests